Mpumalanga, also known as the Mpumalanga Rhinos, are a South African first-class cricket team representing the province of Mpumalanga. They have their headquarters in Witbank and play their home games at Uplands College in White River.

First-class history
When Cricket South Africa decided to expand the Provincial Three-Day Challenge in 2006, Mpumalanga were one of five provincial teams (along with Kei, KwaZulu-Natal Inland, Limpopo and South Western Districts) elevated to first-class status.

Mpumalanga played eight first-class matches in the 2006–07 season. They lost six of them and drew the other two. Four of the defeats were by an innings. They also lost all eight of their matches in the Provincial One-Day Challenge.

Their captain in all matches was Roelof Hugo, who was also the wicket-keeper. He scored 451 runs in the first-class matches at an average of 28.18 and made 21 catches and a stumping. He later played for South Western Districts. The most successful batsman in the first-class matches was Paul van den Berg, who scored 524 runs at 43.66 with one century and also took 16 wickets at 33.43. He later played for Easterns. Adolf van den Berg was the most successful bowler, with 20 wickets at 34.30 as well as 414 runs at 31.84 with one century. In the innings loss to Northerns, the 18-year-old Adriano dos Santos, on his first-class debut, made 133 (out of a team total of 211) and 64. He later played a few matches for Eastern Province.

In a competition that was itself of borderline first-class status, Cricket South Africa considered Mpumalanga's performance (and those of Kei and Limpopo) too weak to justify their place, and after one season, all three teams were omitted. They then played in various sub-first-class competitions. In August 2018, they were included in the 2018 Africa T20 Cup tournament.

Mpumalanga played no further first-class cricket until the 2022–23 season, when both they (now known as the Mpumalanga Rhinos) and Limpopo (the Limpopo Impalas) were readmitted to the South African first-class competition.

References

Further reading
 South African Cricket Annual – various editions
 Wisden Cricketers' Almanack – various editions

External sources
 Lists of matches played by Mpumalanga at CricketArchive
 Mpumalanga Rhinos website

South African first-class cricket teams
Cricket in Mpumalanga